The men's ski cross competition in freestyle skiing at the 2022 Winter Olympics will be held on 18 February, at the Genting Snow Park in Zhangjiakou. Ryan Regez of Switzerland won the event, and his compatriot Alex Fiva won the silver medal, the first Olympic medals for both of them. Sergey Ridzik, representing the Russian Olympic Committee, won the bronze medal, replicating his 2018 success.

The defending champion was Brady Leman. The silver medalist Marc Bischofberger did not qualify. At the 2021–22 FIS Freestyle Ski World Cup, before the Olympics, Regez and Terence Tchiknavorian jointly led the ranking, with Bastien Midol third. Fiva was the 2021 world champion.

Qualification

A total of 32 ski cross athletes qualified to compete at the games. For an athlete to compete they must have a minimum of 80.00 FIS points on the FIS Points List on January 17, 2022 and a top 30 finish in a World Cup event or at the FIS Freestyle Ski World Championships 2021. A country could enter a maximum of four athletes into the event.

Results

Seeding run

Elimination round

1/8 finals

Heat 1

Heat 2

Heat 3

Heat 4

Heat 5

Heat 6

Heat 7

Heat 8

Quarterfinals

Heat 1

Heat 2

Heat 3

Heat 4

Semifinals

Heat 1

Heat 2

Finals
Small final

Big final

References

Men's freestyle skiing at the 2022 Winter Olympics